Evral Trapp (born January 22, 1987) is a Belizean professional footballer who plays as a defender for Hopkins FC and the Belize national football team.

References

External links

1987 births
Living people
Belize international footballers
Belizean footballers
Premier League of Belize players
2011 Copa Centroamericana players
2013 Copa Centroamericana players
2013 CONCACAF Gold Cup players
2014 Copa Centroamericana players
2017 Copa Centroamericana players
Association football defenders
Verdes FC players